Hurst Green railway station is on the Oxted line in southern England and serves the Hurst Green neighbourhood of Oxted in Surrey. The station is managed by Southern.

On the London-bound platform is a staffed ticket office (open during most of the day) and a self-service passenger-operated ticket machine is located outside the station on the London-bound side.

Services 
Off-peak, all services at Hurst Green are operated by Southern using  DMUs and  EMUs.

The typical off-peak service in trains per hour is:
 1 tph to 
 1 tph to 

During the peak hours and on weekends, the service between London Victoria and East Grinstead is increased to 2 tph. 

On Sundays, northbound services on the Uckfield branch terminate at Oxted instead of London Bridge.

History 

The original Hurst Green Halt opened 1 June 1907 with short wooden platforms, sited between the road bridge and the junction of the East Grinstead/Uckfield lines. This halt was closed on 12 June 1961 and the present station was opened on the northside of the bridge.

References

External links 

Railway stations in Surrey
Former Croydon and Oxted Joint Railway stations
Railway stations in Great Britain opened in 1907
Railway stations in Great Britain closed in 1961
Railway stations opened by British Rail
Railway stations in Great Britain opened in 1961
Railway stations served by Govia Thameslink Railway
Oxted